Nicola Renzi (born 18 July 1979) is a Sammarinese politician who is a former foreign minister and served as a Captain Regent with Lorella Stefanelli from 1 October 2015 until 1 April 2016. He first stood for election to the Grand and General Council in 2012 on the Popular Alliance list.

Renzi worked as a Latin and Greek teacher at San Marino High School between 2003 and 2004. He is married and has one child. He holds a PhD in History from the Scuola Superiore di Studi Storici di San Marino.

Honors 

  Order of the Star of Italy (Italy, 2018)

See also
List of foreign ministers in 2017
List of current foreign ministers

References
 Curriculum vitae

1979 births
People from the City of San Marino
21st-century archaeologists
Captains Regent of San Marino
Living people
Members of the Grand and General Council
Popular Alliance (San Marino) politicians
Secretaries of State for Foreign and Political Affairs of San Marino